The University of Narowal is a public university located in Narowal, Punjab, Pakistan.

Eestablished 
It was established in 2012 and it offers undergraduate and graduate programs in a wide range of fields including engineering, technology, natural sciences, social sciences, and humanities.

Ranking  
The University of Narowal is relatively new and its ranking in national and international level may not be high yet but it has the potential to become a leading institution in the region in the future.

References

External links
 

Public universities in Punjab, Pakistan
2014 establishments in Pakistan
Public universities and colleges in Punjab, Pakistan
Narowal District
Educational institutions established in 2014